Ashley Louis David Hicks (born 18 July 1963) is a British interior designer, author, photographer and artist. He is the only son of Lady Pamela Hicks (née Mountbatten) and David Nightingale Hicks. Hicks has designed interiors in Europe, the United States, and the United Kingdom. He also has a fabric line for Lee Jofa  and furniture lines. 

Hicks is the grandson of Louis Mountbatten, 1st Earl Mountbatten of Burma. He was also the godson of his first cousin once-removed, Prince Philip, Duke of Edinburgh.

Early life and family 
Hicks was born on 18 July 1963, in King's College Hospital in Denmark Hill, London. He is the son and second child of David and Lady Pamela Hicks. He is the younger brother of Edwina Brudenell and the older brother of India Hicks, author, television host, fashion model, and founder of her eponymous lifestyle brand.

Hicks was raised at Britwell House, an 18th-century house in Britwell Salome in Oxfordshire, that served as the family's home, as well as his father's showplace. It was there that his father designed elaborate landscapes that were "virtual outdoor rooms with carefully framed vistas". Hicks was a boarding student at Stowe School.  In 1978, the family decided to sell the house, and Hicks attended the three-day Sotheby's sale, 20–22 March 1979. After the auction, the Hicks family moved to The Grove, a nearby estate, and also resided at the Albany, an historic and exclusive apartment house in Piccadilly.

Through his mother, Hicks is a grandson of the first Earl and Countess Mountbatten of Burma. Through his maternal grandfather, Lord Louis Mountbatten, Hicks is a second cousin of King Charles III. He is also the godson of Prince Philip, Duke of Edinburgh.  Lady Edwina Mountbatten was one of Britain's richest women, having inherited most of the £7.5 million fortune of her grandfather, Sir Ernest Cassel.

Family tragedy 
As a child, Hicks spent family holidays at Sligo Castle in Ireland and the Mountbatten family ancestral home at Broadlands in Hampshire, where the royal family were frequent guests. In August 1979, when Hicks was 16 years old, his grandfather and his cousin Nicholas Knatchbull were assassinated by the Provisional Irish Republican Army when his grandfather's wooden boat, the Shadow V, was blown up by a remote-controlled bomb on Donegal Bay. "I didn't go on the boat because I went to buy some cigarettes. It was a beautiful summer's day and I was with India, watching television. We had the windows open and then we heard this big bang."

Career 
Hicks says his first decorating experience took place when he was 15 or 16 years old, when he decorated his room in a checkered black-and-white motif. Everything in his room had to be either black or white, including the ceiling and carpet.

Influenced by his father, Hicks studied painting and fine art, graduating from the Bath School of Art and Design and trained with the Architectural Association School of Architecture, in London. He then worked briefly for his father's interior design house, before establishing his own architectural firm, designing interiors and furniture.

In 1997, Hicks began designing furniture at the Gem Palace in Jaipur, India. His first piece was his interpretation of a Greek Klismos chair, based on a 1920s drawing by an architect. The chair is rendered in Burmese teak, with a seat made of interwoven straps of saddle leather. He describes the chair as "far more like the ancient Greek ones in its construction, than the Neoclassical revivals". When Hicks initially designed in India, he designed under the moniker of "Jantar Mantar". Hicks explains, "It means abracadabra, also hocus pocus, and is local slang for the Jaipur Observatory."

In addition to interior and furniture design, Hicks produces various lines of fabric, wallpaper, and carpeting—some under the "David Hicks by Ashley Hicks" brand and others under his own name. Licences to his fabric and wallpaper collections are held by GP & J Baker; the licences to his carpeting lines are held by Stark and  Alternative Flooring. In 2002, along with his ex-wife Allegra, he wrote Design Alchemy, which provided an overview of the interiors and products they designed.  Hicks also produced a series of Allegra Hicks shops as well as a collection of home accessories that were sold in these shops. In 2017, Hicks published his first book on his own work, Details, which also serves as a source book for his inspiration; published by IDEA Publishing, it sold out within a month.

Hicks began photographing historic interiors for Cabana Magazine in 2016, ranging from a derelict glass factory in Murano, Venice, to grand English country houses like Houghton and Althorp. In 2017 he photographed and wrote a history of Buckingham Palace: The Interiors, published by Rizzoli in conjunction with the Royal Collection. In 2019 he published Rooms with a History, a survey of his own design works and historic interiors that inspired them, all photographed by him.

Hicks is currently a contributing editor for Cabana Magazine.

Hicks exhibited furniture and sculptural objects made by his own hands at New York's R and Company gallery in 2019,

Hicks has also regularly worked with various brands on product collaborations, including a bed linen collection with Frette, a candle range collaboration with Jo Malone and swimsuit collaborations with Orlebar Brown and Coverswim, as well as furniture projects with Kartell and Promemoria.

Personal life
On 18 October 1990, Hicks married Italian designer, Marina Allegra Federica Silvia Tondato (born Turin, Italy, 20 May 1960), a daughter of physicist and musician Dr. Carlo Tondato and his wife, the former Rosy Maza, in Wheatley, Oxfordshire. They met in 1988, at the Café de Paris in London, when he was a student at the Architectural Association and she was studying art history at Sotheby's. He proposed to her over "Twiglets and apple juice at the Groucho Club" in Soho, London. 

From his first marriage, Hicks has two children:

 Angelica Hicks (1992)
 Ambrosia Hicks (1997)

After their wedding, Hicks and his wife lived in a renovated building in New York City that belonged to Marc Chagall's grandson. It was near Fifth Avenue, surrounded by the lofts and studios of local artists. While the building was renovated, the interior of their home was rather low scale, lacking air conditioning. Allegra said of their home, "Although it was a glamorous address it was, for us, more about the people who lived there." They lived in New York from 1991–92. In May 2009, the couple announced the end of their marriage. Allegra remarried in June 2014 Marchese Roberto Mottola di Amato, a Neapolitan landowner and entrepreneur.

On 5 September 2015, Hicks married digital fashion editor Kathryn 'Katalina' Sharkey also known as Kata Sharkey de Solis (born Houston, Texas, U.S., 31 December 1981, daughter of William T. Sharkey, CPA, and Rosalie Solis).

News of their engagement was first reported in Page Six of The New York Post, which detailed that Hicks had been "introduced to de Solis via Instagram in May [2015] by artist Donald “Drawbertson” Robertson, the 'Andy Warhol of Instagram.'”  Their wedding was held at the family's home at The Grove in Oxfordshire and was officiated by the man who had introduced them (who also served as Hicks's best man), Donald Robertson. Hicks had an affair with Martina Mondadori, godmother to his first son with Kata, during Kata's second pregnancy. Ashley and Kata Hicks separated in 2018.

From his second marriage, Hicks has the following children:

 Caspian Donald Hicks (2018)
 Horatio Valentine Hicks (2019)

Hicks decorated his partner Martina Mondadori's home in Milan, Italy, in 2020.

Published works 
 Hicks, Ashley. Rooms with a History, Rizzoli, 2017. 
 Hicks, Ashley. Buckingham Palace: The Interiors, Rizzoli, 2018. 
 Hicks, Ashley. David Hicks Scrapbooks, Vendome Press, 2017. 
 Hicks, Ashley. Details, IDEA Ltd., 2017.
 Hicks, Ashley. David Hicks Scrapbooks, IDEA Ltd., 2016.
 Hicks, Ashley. David Hicks: A Life of Design, Rizzoli, 2009. 
 Hicks, Ashley. David Hicks: Designer, Scriptum Editions, December 2002. 
 Hicks, Ashley; Hicks, Allegra; and Irons, Jeremy (foreword). Design Alchemy, Conran Octopus, May 2002.

References

Further reading 
 Hoey, Brian. Mountbatten: The Private Story, Sidgwick & Jackson, 1994.

External links 
 http://www.ashleyhicks.com/

1963 births
Living people
British furniture designers
British interior designers
British people of German-Jewish descent
People educated at Stowe School